Behind That Curtain is a 1929 American Pre-Code mystery film directed by Irving Cummings, starring Warner Baxter and featuring Boris Karloff. It was the first Charlie Chan film to be made at Fox Studios. It was based on the 1928 novel of the same name. Charlie Chan, who is played by Korean-American actor E. L. Park, gets one mention early in the film, then makes a few momentary appearances after 75 minutes. Producer William Fox chose this film to open the palatial Fox Theatre in San Francisco on June 28, 1929. It was a sound film.

Cast
 Warner Baxter as Col. John Beetham
 Lois Moran as Eve Mannering Durand
 Gilbert Emery as Sir Frederick Bruce (as Gilbert Emory)
 Claude King as Sir George Mannering
 Philip Strange as Eric Durand
 Boris Karloff as Beetham's Manservant
 Jamiel Hasson as Sahib Hana
 Peter Gawthorne as British Police Inspector
 John Rogers as Alf Pornick
 Edgar Norton as Hilary Galt
 E.L. Park as Police Insp. Charlie Chan

See also
 Boris Karloff filmography

References

External links

1929 films
1929 mystery films
1920s English-language films
American black-and-white films
American mystery films
Charlie Chan films
Films directed by Irving Cummings
Films based on mystery novels
Films based on American novels
Films produced by William Fox
Films with screenplays by Sonya Levien
Fox Film films
1920s American films